List of English football transfers 2003–04 may refer to:

List of English football transfers summer 2003
List of English football transfers winter 2003–04
List of English football transfers summer 2004

Transfers
2003